Vyacheslav Petrovich Artyomov (born June 29, 1940, in Moscow) is a Russian and Soviet composer.

Biography
Artyomov was preparing to become a physicist, studying music at the same time. He finished studying at the musical college affiliated to the Moscow Conservatory (composition class of A. Pirumov), then graduated from the Moscow Conservatory in 1968, where he studied composition with Nikolai Sidelnikov and piano with Tovi Logovinsky. He became a member of the Union of Soviet Composers and Association for Contemporary Music (ACM). He was active as an editor at the Moscow publishers "Musyka" for several years.

In 1975, he joined the improvisation group "Astreya", together with the composers Sofia Gubaidulina and Viktor Suslin. In 1979, he was blacklisted as one of the Khrennikov's Seven at the Sixth Congress of the Union of Soviet Composers for unapproved participation in some festivals of Soviet music in the West.

His music was performed by M.Rostropovich, G.Rozhdestvensky, D.Kytaenko, V.Fedoseyev, M.Pletnyov, V.Spivakov, T.Currentzis, Virko Baley, D.Alexeev, S.Bunin, F.Kopachevsky, L.Isakadze, T.Grindenko, Yo-Yo Ma, A.Rudin, O.Yanchenko, L. Petrova.

Music

Artyomov's compositions show his interest in the archaic ("Incantations", "Totem") and Christian motifs ("Requiem", "Ave, Maria") as well as Eastern meditation ("Awakening", "A Symphony of Elegies", "Moonlight Dreams"). As a young composer, he developed a profound interest, successively, in Russian folklore, traditional music of the East, works of Prokofiev, Stravinsky, Messiaen, and the Polish avant-garde. But it was Arthur Honegger's Symphonie Liturgique, as well as the works of Edgar Varèse and Sinfonia by Luciano Berio that made the greatest and most lasting impression on him.

Artyomov considers music a science – concentration of soul experience – and, side by side with astrophysics, – one of two main fundamental sciences: astrophysics broaden the horizon of knowledge of the universe, and music exposes the profundity and strength of human's spirit, his interconnection with the World's Soul (Anima Mundi). Music is "a mediator between God and man", "a concentrate of spiritual energy, which should awaken man's ethical understanding and purify his soul" (Foundation of the Philosophy of Music).

"Artyomov would appear to be just the sort of composer whose appearance is especially timely at this point in the life of his country ... His music and his artistic outlook in general reflect the questing for a new order of spiritual values as well as a new regard for individuality." (Richard Freed. Kennedy Center Stagebill, September 1990)

"What we are witnessing is music that dares simply to exist, shining like the sun, allowing us to bask in its warmth … The first part of the tetralogy, the Way to Olympus, is stunning ... Artyomov's On the Threshold of a Bright World is even more rare – it is a work of genius" (Octavio Roca. The Washington Times, September 24, 1990)

"What cannot be emphasized too strongly is the nobility and sincerity of genuine spirituality which informs so much of Artyomov's art. It is an astounding creation, occupying a unique place for its composer and for Russian music in the last quarter of the 20th century." (Robert Matthew-Walker. "Elegies" CD by Olympia, 1993).

"In the age of minimalism and abstraction Artyomov stands apart – his music is created to serve a greater purpose, much in the same way as the later works of Scriabin and the music of Messiaen." (Stephen A. Whealton. Way to Olympus CD by Mobile Fidelity, 1989)

"Vyacheslav Artyomov is considered by many to be Russia's greatest living composer ... His music is deep, ultimately spiritual and brilliantly crafted, with influences from the Russian symphonic tradition colored by Mahler, Honegger and Messiaen to name a few – but melded into a unique voice." (Kathryn Marshall. "Divine Art", 2016)

"Artyomov writes big, ambitious tunes; listening to his music — and also on this Way to Olympus CD – we always feel small; Artyomov is a being who understands and has mastery of the universe while we are merely hairless monkeys on a speck of dust on the distant tip of the Sagittarius arm of the Milky Way." (JMC. The Chronicle, 13 September 2018. www.chronicleseries.co.uk)

Digest of press reviews on Artyomov’s ten CDs released by Divine Art during last three years (see “Quotations” below).
For the first time in recent decades, enthusiastic assessments of contemporary Russian culture have appeared in the foreign press. The reason was a series of ten CDs with recording of works by the Russian composer Vyacheslav Artyomov, which was released by the English-American company Divine Art as a tribute to the composer on the occasion of his 80th anniversary. The series has provoked great public resonance to Artyomov's music and the avalanche of reviews in popular music editions like Gramophone, American Record Guide, Pizzicato, Musical Opinion, Fanfare, The Classical Reviewer, etc. They often contain expressions such as «the most unusual talent today», «a work of exceptional beauty», «new order of spiritual values», «masterpiece», «unforgettable and touching», «magnificent», «bravo». Some consider Artyomov as “one of the greatest living composers” (MusicWebInternational), “one of the most individual and distinctive composers not just in the music of his native Russia but in Western Classical music as a whole!” (Musical Opinion), for others “The series of issues and re-issues of the music of Vyacheslav Artyomov on Divine Art is one of the primary revival events of the past decade… It is time we celebrate his music—as the most bracing and original music of our times”(Classical Modern Music). Some reviewers recall that Mstislav Rostropovich, who ordered and performed three Artyomov's symphonies (two of them performed by Teodor Currentzis and Vladimir Ashkenazi were included in the present series), was absolutely visionary saying: “Artyomov has absolutely clear and unique composer’s image... Artyomov brings glory to our country and to Russian art”. The French edition Classica had remembered even the former persecutor of Artyomov—Tikhon Khrennikov, who “by the irony of history (like A.Salieri who after listening to Mozart’s Requiem in Amadeus said: «Forgive your assassin! Mozart!») also eventually recognized the greatness of his enemy” and after the performance of Artyomov's Requiem told journalists: “Artyomov is outstanding composer. His Requiem has raised Russian music to the unattainable previously height. I’m sure it is due to Artyomov that we have not only reached the European level in this genre, but surpassed its acmes—Requiems by Mozart and Verdi”. Christian edition The Christian Review writes: “The profound, spiritual nature of Vyacheslav Petrovich Artyomov’s music led the conductor Teodor Currentzis to liken the Russian composer, who was born in 1940 in Moscow and is considered Russia’s greatest living composer, to Anton Bruckner”. Due to the great interest in Artyomov's work, Divine Art decided to supplement the series by releasing new discs. Disc Astraea containing joint improvisations on non-orchestral instruments of composers V.Artyomov, S.Gubaidulina and V.Suslin was released in January 2020 (re-release of the 1994 disc). The Artyomov's eleventh CD (Album XI), which includes mostly unreleased chamber works by the composer, is expected in May 2020. (R.Gruzdkov. Way Up, 3, 2020)

Works

Symphony of the Way (tetralogy):
 Way to Olympus, a symphony 1978–1984
 On the Threshold of a Bright World, a symphony 1990, 2002, rev.2013
 Gentle Emanation, a symphony 1991, 2008
 The Morning Star Arises, a symphony 1993

The Star of Exodus (trilogy):
 In Memoriam, a symphony with violin solo 1968, 1984
 In Spe, a symphony with violin and cello solos 1995–2014
 In Gloriam, a symphony with two piano solos, choir and soloists 2020-
 Requiem, 1985–1988
 Gurian Hymn, 1986
 A Symphony of Elegies, 1977
 A Garland of Recitations, 1975–1981
 Tristia I, 1983
 Pietà, 1992, 1996
 Tristia II, 1997, 1998, rev. 2011

Latin Hymns:
 Miserere mei, 2003
 Ave,Maria, 1989
 Salve Regina, 2003
 Ave Maris Stella, 2003
 Variations: Nestling Antsali, 1974
 Scenes, 1971
 Capriccio on the ’75 New Year's Eve, 1975
 Totem, 1976
 Star Wind, 1981
 Hymns of Sudden Wafts, 1983
 Incantations, 1981
 Moonlight Dreams, 1982
 Maltese Hymn Ave, Crux Alba, 1994, 2012

Discography
CDBMR011129 – Vyacheslav Artyomov: Requiem Moscow Philharmonic Symphony Orchestra – Boheme
CDBMR002124 – Vyacheslav Artyomov: – Ave – Boheme
CDBMR010127 – Vyacheslav Artyomov: Awakening, Concert of the 13, Morning Songs & A Garland of Recitations – Boheme
OCD514 – Vyacheslav Artyomov: Invocations Lydia Davydova/Mark Pekarsky/Percussion Ensemble – Olympia
OCD516 – Vyacheslav Artyomov: Way Various – Olympia
OCD 515 – Vyacheslav Artyomov: Elegies – Olympia
MFCD 903 – Vyacheslav Artyomov: Gurian Hymn, Incantation, Way to Olympus – Mobile Fidelity
MFCD 918 – Vyacheslav Artyomov: Songs, Hymns and Dreams – Mobile Fidelity
74321 56261 2 – Vyacheslav Artyomov: Lamentations, Gurian Hymn, Tristia I, Way to Olympus – BMG
SLR0027 – Astreya (Artyomov, Gubaidulina, Suslin)- Solyd Records
dda 25143 — Vyacheslav Artyomov: Gentle Emanation, Tristia II — T.Currentzis, V.Ponkin, Ph.Kopachevsky, RNO — Divine Art
dda 25144 — Vyacheslav Artyomov: On the Threshold of a Bright World, Ave atque vale, Ave, crux alba — V.Ashkenazy, R. Sharayevsky, NFOR — Divine Art
dda 25164 – Vyacheslav Artyomov: Sola Fide-suites 3 & 4, Tempo Costante – D.Kitayenko, M.Annamamedov, Academic SO of MSF, MCO Musica Viva, Kaunas SC – Divine Art
dda 25171– Vyacheslav Artyomov: Way to Olympus, Gurian Hymn, Preludes to Sonnets, Concert of the 13 – T.Minbayev, D.Kitayenko, G.Rozhdestvensky, A.Batagov, Y.Smirnov, T.Grindenko, Y.Adjemova, P.Meschaninov, USSR State SO, Academic SO of MSF – Divine Art
dda 25172 – Vyacheslav Artyomov: A Symphony of Elegies, Awakening, Incantations – S.Sondeckis, T.Grindenko, O.Krysa, L.Davydova, M.Pekarsky Percussion Ensemble, Lithuanian CO – Divine Art
dda 25173 – Vyacheslav Artyomov: Requiem – Soloists, Sveshnikov Boys' Chorus, Victor Popov, Kaunas State Chorus, Piatris Bingialis, Moscow Philharmonic Symphony Orchestra, Dmitri Kitaenko – Divine Art
dda 25174 Vyacheslav Artyomov: A Sonata of Meditations, A Garland of Recitations, Totem – Virko Baley, M. Pekarsky Percussion Ensemble, Academic SO of MSF – Divine Art
dda 25175 Vyacheslav Artyomov: In Memoriam, Lamentations, Pietà, Tristia I – D. Kitayenko, T. Mynbayev, M. Annamamedov, O. Krysa, A. Rudin, S. Bunin, O. Yanchenko, Academic SO of MSF, USSR State SO, CO Musica Viva – Divine Art
dda 25176 Vyacheslav Artyomov: Star Wind, Variations: Nestling Antsali, Moonlight Dreams, Romantic Capriccio, Mattinate (Morning Sonds), Scenes – M.Annamamedov, N.Lee, A.Korneyev, V.Artyomov, Chamber Ensembles – Divine Art
dda 25184 Vyacheslav Artyomov: In Spe, Latin Hymns – V.Uriupin, I.Pochekin, A.Buzlov, N.Pavlova, RNO, Yurlov Capella – Divine Art

Last recordings
Vyacheslav Artyomov: Gentle Emanation, Tristia II RNO, T.Currentzis, V.Pon'kin, Ph.Kopachevsky – by FSC (2010)
Vyacheslav Artyomov: On the Threshold of a Bright World, Ave Atque Vale, Ave,Crux Alba NFOR, V. Ashkenazy, R. Sharayevsky – by FSC (2013)
Vyacheslav Artyomov: In Spe, Latin Hymns – I. Pochekin, A. Buzlov, N. Pavlova, Yurlov Coral Capella, RNO, V. Uriupin – by FSC (2018)

Quotations from the last reviews

"Surprise! This is a fully developed voice in new music, someone who has carried over the mysterious cosmos of late Scriabin and Messiaen and made something new out of the unrealized potentials that lurked behind those composers' most prescient creations. Artyomov speaks to me, in elegant and vivid eloquence. The Russian National Orchestra under conductors Teodor Currentzis and Vladimir Ponkin bring this complex and very personal music into vivid relief against the seeming silence of the universe. Artyomov travels in the wake of those before and manages to say something new and different. That is a remarkable achievement and he most certainly deserves a hearing.
All you modernists and seekers of the new look no further, at least today. Give a listen to Vyacheslav Artyomov on this very moving sample of his work. It gives us another way to thread the futurist needle." – Grego Applegate Edwards (Gapplegate Classical Modern Music, February 16, 2017)

"This on a macro [scale], it making the listener think of the vastness of space. Both [symphonies] are monumental in ambition, and in sound, making any review a little trite. Both CDs certainly make an impression. The sleeve notes explain some of what's going on but Vyacheslav Artyomov demands (in all senses of the word) the listener to make an effort. It's compulsive listening. They're both out on Divine Art, which lives up to its mission statement." (Innovative, Eclectic, Fascinating, Inspirational) with these CDs. Jeremy Condliffe (The Chronicle) – joint review with dda 25143)

"Vyacheslav Artyomov is a distinctive and important voice in Russian music. These impressive symphonies are like momentous journeys, full of incident and emotion and the most wonderful ideas. The performances are all that you could wish for making these two discs valuable releases." – Bruce Reader (The Classical Reviewer)

"Two of those symphonies make welcome appearances here in characterful performances, vividly recorded. There is an unmistakable sense of a journey travelled and of emotional states transfigured into spirit. All the performances here are terrific and Robert Matthew-Walker's booklet-notes argue at passionate length for Artyomov's uniqueness and importance." – David Fanning (Gramophone) – joint review with dda 25144

"[The Symphony] is an engaging work that makes a considerable impact. Predominantly underpinned by low, resonant sound from the basses and organ, one senses the work is depicting the aspects of the universe. Ave atque vale is a gratifying work that can engage the listener with reasonable concentration. Ave Crux Alba is weighty and highly dramatic. Under the baton of Vladimir Ashkenazy the National Philharmonic Orchestra of Russia has full measure of the work conveying a sense of mystery and an impressive overall grasp. This album of works by Vyacheslav Artyomov, one of Russia's unsung composers, make a substantial impression with his unique soundworld." – Michael Cookson (MusicWeb)

"World premiere recordings of two major works by Russian composer Vyacheslav Artyomov, completed by the short transcription of the Maltese Hymn in excellent performances conducted by Vladimir Ashkenazy. The expressive music is good for an interesting discovery." (award 4/5 stars) – Norbert Tischer (Pizzicato, Luxembourg)

"These two symphonies (parts of a tetralogy) are unlike The Planets, unless you think of them as uber-Holst: they cause a visceral reaction and suggest a metaphysical cri de coeur ... they embody mystery and the unknown. They are both accessible" – Vanessa Wells (The Whole Note) – joint review with dda 25144

"The Symphony On the Threshold of a Bright World is in 18 continuous episodes, separately tracked. A surreal and even psychedelic ambience is the order of the day. It is like a Dali dreamscape in constant and meltingly waxy motion. There is some glorious writing. The short Ave, Crux Alba – The Order of Malta Hymn – is sensationally grand and strides – never struts. It makes a huge sound accentuated by a lively acoustic. The sound is good and carries the whispers and grand climactics with satisfying fidelity. There is certainly plenty to intrigue and enthral." – Rob Barnett (MusicWeb)

"Gentle Emanation is in 28 continuous episodes and three sections. The music flickers and pounds like a huge metal stamping machine. There's more than a touch of Messiaen's wildness about this and those shivering Scriabinisms, already commented on in the symphony On the Threshold of a Bright World, are also present. Tristia II was written to mark the sixtieth birthday of Vladimir Ashkenazy. It's highly unconventional and the first and last tracks incorporate Nikolai Gogol's supplicatory prayer to some angel-custodian, here voiced at quarters close and warm by Mikhail Philippov. Very knowledgeable notes." – Rob Barnett (MusicWeb)

"With Currentzis the [Symphony] is interpreted by a conductor who sees Artyomov as the 21 st century's Bruckner. Correspondingly he develops the piece with intensity and effectiveness for its whole duration. The emphasis of this composition {Tristia II] however, is on the piano part, which blends naturally in the orchestral movement. The Russian national orchestra is an established, successful body which devotes itself expertly to Artyomov's work. With Ponkin and even more so with Currentzis they found conductors, who are able to shape the large forms and create tension which persists. Pianist Kopachevsky mastered the piano part with excellence." (awarded 5 stars) – Uwe Krusch (Pizzicato)

"Impressively annotated, impeccably produced, neatly packaged.. The music in both these CD's and the composer deserve wider exposure outside Russia. Artyomov's music is mystical, Russian at the core. He is a master of orchestral writing and of unusual instrumentation. Many of his melodies have their roots in old Slavonic chant. A most unusual talent whose day has yet to come insofar as the American concert-going audience is concerned." – Rafael de Acha (Rafael Music Notes)

"This large-scale work—with its huge dynamic range, its bouts of gnarled Bergian harmonies, its vehement percussion outbursts, its anguished strivings, its Messiaenic bird-chattering in the woodwinds, its Schoenbergian flutter-tonguing—is far closer to neo-Expressionism than it is to anything by the so-called New Spiritualists. Tristia II ... is shorter, gentler, and more hypnotic, a piece that's apt to whisper as often as Gentle Emanations is to scream. Both works get what sound like committed performances—and the sound is no obstacle." – Peter J. Rabinowitz (Fanfare)

"This symphony (Gentle Emanation) is unmistakably serious and spiritual, and its many colorful or even exotic details (for example, the almost Middle Eastern wind writing in Episode 5, and elsewhere, and a variety of bird calls—including a cuckoo— in Episode 13) prevent the music from seeming grim, even though there are no smiles here.
The remaining four episodes ( On the Threshold) seem to serve as a conciliatory postlude, and here, Artyomov's writing becomes increasingly beautiful. The closing minutes of the symphony are very moving.
Ave, Crux Alba is the most immediately impressive work on these two CDs. Artyomov has created a strong and noble melody for the chorus, and dressed it in splendid orchestral garb. "Wrong" notes and harmonies intensify the emotional impact. In concert, this would get a standing ovation. ovation. It wouldn't be bad at the end of the Hollywood movie, either. The chorus is solid as a rock." — Raymond Tuttle (Fanfare)

"Way to Olympus is a complex, thoughtful and ultimately satisfying symphony. If it had a chance, I believe it could be one of the ‘great' examples of this genre for our time.
Gurian Hymn is a gorgeous work that is both inspiring and thoughtful. The concept of the four disparate layers working out their own destiny is memorable and moving.
Vyacheslav Artyomov's music parallels the beauty of the sonnets, with its emphasis on the everlasting cycle of life and death. Preludes to Sonnets remind me of late Scriabin; truly stunning." – John France (MusicWeb International, 2018)

"A Symphony of Elegies – this profound and essentially unique work can equally be seen as a musical equivalent of Eastern meditation, in its mostly un-rhythmic flow in which time and movement seem to lose meaning, the two solo violins in their highest register creating a vision of observation from above.
It is an astounding creation, occupying a unique place for its composer and for Russian music from the last quarter of the 20th century.
Artyomov is undoubtedly a successor to Scriabin: inhabiting a mystical world, certainly, but one founded upon natural, basic principles, which at its most compelling illuminates aspects of human existence in a way not approached by any other composer." – Robert Mathew-Walker (notes for A Symphony of Elegies CD, 2018)

"Symphony: The Way to Olympus. It is a beautifully paced, sprawling and highly evocative sound poem for orchestra, here recorded some time ago but sounding gloriously well ... I hear a penetrating inwardness and a contrastingly outward skyrocketing elation to the music. The work is very dramatic, moving, original ... Artyomov on the basis of this volume and the others comes before us as a tragically underappreciated Modern master, a Russian Ives in terms of creating beautifully advanced music in spite of social neglect and isolation. His time has come. 
He is a Russian master that has suffered neglect for far too long. It is time we celebrate his music. It is High Modern in a very evocative way. It is not easily forgotten once you give it your full attention! Bravo! ☆☆☆☆☆" – Grego Applegate Edwards (Classical Modern Music. 18 July 2018)

"Music that is by turns riotously colourful, knowingly confrontational and profoundly moving ...
This fascinating disc (Way to Olympus) provides a decent starting point for listeners keen to investigate the strangely diffuse but parallel worlds of a Russian composer whose oeuvre seems consistently unpredictable. While the riotous Symphony gets the top billing, I would actually dare to suggest that the deeply impressive Gurian Hymn is well worth the disc's asking price on its own." – Richard Hanlon (MusicWeb International, July, 2018)

"This recording of the two suites, in particular, served as an excellent introduction to the work of Artyomov and encouraged me to seek out of his Requiem and his symphony On the Threshold of a Bright World. Having heard these I shall certainly be on the lookout for further recordings of works by this composer who is the only composer now creating serious monumental compositions of tremendous strength and beauty. He is Bruckner of the 21st century." (Teodor Currentzis, conductor). editor@iclassical.co.uk (iClassical rating *****, July 31, 2018)

"It is always interesting to encounter works by composers with whom one is unfamiliar and on this occasion it was truly stimulating and has set me on the road to exploring further treasures by Artyomov. There seems to be a genuine spirituality and sense of dignity underlying his works and if you are prepared to listen attentively you will find this music communicates with you in a most direct manner. A revelation!" – editor@iclassical.co.uk (iClassical rating *****, July 31, 2018)

"Vyacheslav Artyomov's one-movement symphony (Way to Olympus) is the atmospheric centrepiece of this disc – the layering of sounds is hypnotic and the effect is powerful!" – Freya Parr (BBC Music Magazine, September,2018)

"(Artyomov) has certainly written a good deal, notably two cycles of symphonies: Symphony of the Way, which is a tetralogy consisting of Way to Olympus, On the Threshold of a Bright World, Gentle Emanation and The Morning Star Arises, and The Star of Exodus, a trilogy with soloists consisting of In Memoriam, In Spe and In Gloriam (the last possibly unfinished). Some parts of these have been recorded, along with other works, and the enterprising Divine Art label is in the process of reissuing them. There is also a Requiem, apparently the first to be written in Russia since the 1917 revolution, which has been much praised. I look forward to exploring more Artyomov." – (from: Stephen Barber, MWI, 13 November 2018)

"Artyomov writes big, ambitious tunes; listening to his music — and also on this (Way to Olympus) the fourth CD – we always feel small; Artyomov is a being who understands and has mastery of the universe while we are merely hairless monkeys on a speck of dust on the distant tip of the Sagittarius arm of the Milky Way." – (from: Jeremy Condliffe. The Congleton Chronicle, 13 September 2018)

"The profound, spiritual nature of Vyacheslav Petrovich Artyomov's music has led the conductor Teodor Currentzis to liken the Russian composer, who was born in 1940 in Moscow and is considered Russia's greatest living composer, to Anton Bruckner.
For admirers of Artyomov's works the release of these recordings of two of his finest symphonies (each is quite arresting and beautiful), along with the additional works that are included and the excellence of the conductors and musicians, surely will be welcome and perhaps will lead to new insights and appreciation. For those new to Artyomov's works, they are an excellent introduction to a composer of genius.
Majestic and dramatic at times, reflective and interior at others, and some times playful, On the Threshold of a Bright World and Gentle Emanation seeks to depict the awe-inspiring mystery of God. This is not the music of a Russian Orthodox Divine Liturgy. It is, however, music that captures a sense of God as the mysterious, uncontainable, uncreated light, and human beings as creatures struggling to meet their God, music that has at its core a clear understanding of the Orthodox faith." – (from: Rev. Kevin Bezner. Music for the Soul by Vyacheslav Artyomov, Russia's Greatest Living Composer, January 22, 2017)

"Both of Artyomov's records (symphonies) are retrospective collections of orchestral music, from as early as 1990 and revised as recently as 2011. The Russian composer writes in a range of styles, from the straightforward and neoclassical to atmospheric and aggressively modern.
With this flexibility of approach his music never sounds quite stable or steady. Even short works threaten to rupture and swerve from the expected. What may start off sounding like Ligetian density and volume can quickly revert to the bizarre playfulness of a Mahler scherzo. This stylistic cosmopolitanism is a strength that keeps the music afloat, even through a couple of hours. It also presents something of a challenge, in that there is little that is predictable or that can be taken for granted in any of the works recorded here. This constant demand for attention can be tiring, but is usually rewarding. I must admit that I'd never heard of Artyomov before getting these records, but I certainly find myself wanting to hear more!" – (from: George Adams. American Record Guide. April 2017)

"(Requiem) Here is a great masterpiece, and no mistake. The first-ever setting of the Roman liturgy by a Russian composer, this great work appeared in the final days of the Soviet Union, which caused something of a sensation at its Moscow premiere – not only for the fact of its existence, but also for the originality and masterly quality of the composer's invention. Artyomov is without question one of the greatest living composers." – (from: Robert Matthew-Walker. Musical Opinion Magazine, October–December 2018)

"Listening to this music (Requiem) again after a few years really brings home what a sensitive ear Artyomov has, and amplifies how carefully and tellingly he deploys his huge resources, especially piano and percussion, in this work. His vocal writing is also expert, both for soloists and chorus. Often there is a sense of note spinning in this kind of repertoire, but in its very different way this work reveals Artyomov's adeptness in writing for voices ...
His goal was nothing short of a large scale work which would act as a vehicle for national expiation. For all the terror, catastrophe and violence implied in this piece, its extremity is somehow reined in. It never gets too much, and there is a profound formal elegance at play ...
I have known it (Requiem) for not far short of twenty years and it still grips, moves, and surprises at every turn." – (from: Richard Hanlon. Music Web International. 2019)

"(Requiem) It is world's apart from the Mozart and Fauré requiems for example, and instead has the same sense of 'finality' as do the Berlioz and Verdi scores, but with a much more universal overtone to it, and has a way of lingering in your mind long after audition. It was written for the millions of Russians who suffered and died by the hands of tyranny, but still resounds today for all of those killed due to greed and intolerance." – (from: Jean-Yves Duperron – October 2018, classicalmusicsentinel.com)

"For the past half-century, Vyacheslav Artyomov (b1940) has proved himself again and again to be one of the most individual and distinctive composers not just in the music of his native Russia but in Western Classical music as a whole ...
Artyomov's harmonic and rhythmic patterns, and its underlying pulse, while almost glacially slow at times are more varied and never static. Rather, the music seems at some stratospheric height, its invention stretched out over an entirely different timeframe, or timeframe of reference. Its three movements are captivating, mesmerising, utterly compelling. Superb." – (from: Guy Rickards, Musical Opinion, January – March, 2019)

"In keeping with expectations associated with Requiem this work is a grand statement. Its subject matter is as much about Russia, its people and their tragic history as about Christianity and Eternity. Artyomov's musical language is hard-hitting but not avant-garde in any West Coast or London Round House sense.
Artyomov has made a renewed impact in the last two years and this is largely due to the recording label, Divine Art. I say 'renewed' because in previous decades his music has been available thorough Olympia, Melodiya, Gramzapis, Boheme and Mobile Fidelity.
If you need to orientate yourself with this composer then try the site's reviews of The Way to Olympus (review review), Sola Fide and the symphonies (review ~ review). Robert Matthew-Walker's now very rarely-found book on Artyomov was published in 1997 y DGR Books of St Austell." – (from: Rob Barnett. Music Web International, 15 November 2018)

"Artyomov chooses to play the card of monumental pathos: his Requiem is a vast cry that alternates revolt and elegy, vehemence and lamentation. The mass of the choruses is combined with a powerful orchestra that is further strengthened by the organ and the bells. From the dissonance of the most tense moments (Dies Irae, Tuba Mirum), to the plaints of feminine voices rising in calmness, everything is done to upset the listener, to force him to face the suffering of the Russia. In an irony of history, Khrennikov, who had organized the boycott of Artyomov, also ends up recognizing the greatness of his enemy in his hearing of this work ... We would almost think of Salieri faced with the Requiem of Mozart in Amadeus." – (from: Sarah Léon (Classica, France) – translation by Stephen Sutton, 4 March 2019)

"Many consider Vyacheslav Artyomov Russia's greatest living composer.
Sola Fide underwent a lengthy gestation. It began in the early 1980s with a suggestion from Nikita Dolgushin, a Leningrad-based dancer and choreographer, that Artyomov compose a ballet based on Aleksey Tolstoy's trilogy Road to Calvary. A libretto was initially mooted 'after the novel' from Valeriya Lyubetskaya. This turned out not to be feasible. The composer thus adapted the subject, retaining the novel's principal characters, especially that of the Poet, who symbolizes Culture – the creation and dissemination of which justifies humanity. The death of the Poet signifies the collapse of Humankind. Artyomov decided on a ballet-requiem, employing a full choir and soloists. Due to pressures of work the ballet was put on hold, but a Requiem emerged dedicated to the 'Martyrs of long-suffering Russia'. It was premiered in 1988. It was not until 2016 that Sola Fide was finally completed. It consists of 30 episodes in 3 acts, 10 of which are shared with the Requiem. The episodes are forged into five suites: Katia, Dasha, Poet, The Terrible Days and Catastrophe. This recording includes Katia and The Terrible Days, two suites shared with the Requiem. Once again the composer dedicated the ballet to the 'Martyrs of long-suffering Russia' ... This captivating release will no doubt stir me on to explore more of this composer's strikingly potent music." – (from: Stephen Greenbank. MWI, June 2018)

"As the author, over 20 years ago now, of the first book ever to be published on the music of Vyacheslav Artyomov (born 1940), it has been a singular pleasure for me to have witnessed his slow but growing acceptance by many to become Russia's greatest living composer. As Divine Art has rightly claimed, after the fall of the Soviet regime his music has travelled the world to great acclaim. It is deep, ultimately spiritual and brilliantly crafted, with influences from the Russian symphonic tradition coloured by Mahler, Scriabin, Honegger and Messiaen to name a few — but melded into a unique voice!
The tradition Artyomov follows on much of the CD here is that of Russian ballet, and this new release contains two further suites drawn from his ballet 'Sola Fide' ('Only by Faith'), based on Tolstoi's novel The Road to Calvary, and therefore naturally sharing the ethos and music of Artyomov's Requiem — the first Requiem (1985–88) to be written by a Russian, let alone a Soviet, composer." – (from: Robert Matthew-Walker. Musical Opinion, April – June 2018)

"Vyacheslav Artyomov prefers not to call his music 'contemporary', but uses a special term to denote its inclusion in the Tradition – 'musica perennis' ('eternal music'). A distinctive feature of the composer's works is their spirituality and loftiness, deep religiousness. According to the author 'Music is the greatest achievement of human genius. And it is the only cultural phenomenon that promotes the development of high moral qualities in people.' " – (from: iskusstvo.pro 2018/03/01)

"Vyacheslav Artyomov is regarded as Russia's greatest living composer. Artyomov's warm, expressive compositions reflect his interest in the archaic, Christian motifs and Eastern meditation. He prefers not to call his music 'contemporary', using instead a specific term for including it into the Tradition 'musica perennis' (eternal music). As he says, 'music is the only way for the cognition of the sense of existence'. Since the fall of the Soviet regime his deep, spiritual and brilliantly crafted music has travelled the world to great acclaim." – (from: John Pitt. New Classics. new-classics.co.uk)

"The Symphony (In Spe) is superb, wonderful. But Latin Hymns is divine truly: it is the best choral work I have heard since Mahler's 8th Symphony." – (Stephen Sutton, CEO, Divine Art Recordings Group, 24 January 2019)

Bibliography
Artëmov, Vjačeslav; V. Mud'jugina (2004): Vjačeslav Artëmov. Muzyka, Moskau. . [Booklet, Russian and English]

Notes

Sources
Gerard McBurney, "Vyacheslav Artyomov" in Contemporary Composers (Chicago & London: St. James Press, 1992)

Further reading
The New Grove Dictionary of Music and Musicians. Vol. 2. London 2001
The International Who's Who in Classical Music 2003. Europa Publications. London 2003
Andreas Kloth (2009): Der russische Komponist Vjačeslav Artëmov: Ein Beispiel für die politisch und gesellschaftlich bedingte Rezeption nonkonformistischer sowjetischer Komponisten. Die Blaue Eule, Essen. 
M. John. Auf dem Wege zu einer neuen Geistigkeit. Verlag Ernst Kuhn. Berlin 1996
M. Lobanova. Vyacheslav Artyomov: Tempo costante. Konzert fǖr Orchester. In Das Orchester, December 1993.
Robert Matthew-Walker (1997): The music of Vyacheslav Artyomov: an introduction. St Austell. 
M. Tarakanov. Vyacheslav Artyomov in search of artistic truth. In: Tsenova, Valeria. Underground Music from the USSR. Harwood Academic Publishers. Amsterdam. 1997
O.Nesterenko. A Requiem for the USSR: From Atheism to Secularity. The Yale Journal of Music & Religion. Vol. 6: No. 2, Article 4.

External links
"Vyacheslav Artyomov", chat.ru
"Temenos presents: Vyacheslav Artyomov", temenos.info (in Russian)

1940 births
Living people
Musicians from Moscow
Russian male classical composers
Soviet male composers
Moscow Conservatory alumni
21st-century classical composers
20th-century classical composers
20th-century Russian male musicians
21st-century Russian male musicians